Ronald Alan Boxall (born 1963) is a retired United States Navy vice admiral who last served as the director for force structure, resources, and assessment of the Joint Staff. He was raised in Holland Patent, New York and graduated from Pennsylvania State University with a B.S. degree in science in 1984. Boxall later earned an M.S. degree in information systems from the Naval Postgraduate School and an M.A. degree in national security and strategic studies from the Naval War College.

Awards and decorations

References

1963 births
Living people
Place of birth missing (living people)
People from Oneida County, New York
Eberly College of Science alumni
Naval Postgraduate School alumni
Naval War College alumni
Recipients of the Legion of Merit
United States Navy vice admirals
Recipients of the Defense Superior Service Medal
Recipients of the Navy Distinguished Service Medal